Arthur Jafa (born Arthur Jafa Fielder, November 30, 1960) is an American video artist and cinematographer.

Early life and education 
Jafa was born on November 30, 1960 in Tupelo, Mississippi and raised in Clarksdale, Mississippi which was highly segregated at the time. His parents were both educators and Jafa was raised Catholic.

As a child, Jafa assembled binders full of found images in collections he called "the books." He also grew up watching shows like I Spy, and science fiction programs.

Jafa studied architecture and film at Howard University before moving to Atlanta, Georgia.

Artistic career 
The science fiction programs Jafa watched as a child has informed his artistic practice as an adult, as seen in his self portrait "LeRage" (2017). His work is also inspired by his interest in jazz musician Miles Davis.

He has exhibited at the Hirshhorn Museum and Sculpture Garden, the Museum of Contemporary Art, Los Angeles, and the Julia Stoschek Collection, as well as many others. He has worked as a cinematographer with directors Julie Dash and Spike Lee. His work on Dash's Daughters of the Dust (1991) won "Best Cinematography" Award at Sundance.

His seven-minute video essay Love Is the Message, The Message Is Death is in the collections of the Metropolitan Museum of Art, the Museum of Contemporary Art, Los Angeles, The San Francisco Museum of Modern Art, and the High Museum of Art. Set to Kanye West's song "Ultralight Beam", the work consists of a series of found images and video clips depicting a range of Black American experiences throughout history which establishes that the black experience is not monolithic, every experience is unique. Among many other clips exploring African American life and resiliency, the video essay juxtaposes recordings of police violence and footage from the Civil Rights Movement with clips of Black artistry, pop culture, celebration, and creativity. Jafa himself has connected the ethos of the work with his Catholic roots and Gian Lorenzo Bernini's "Ecstasy of Saint Teresa". On Friday, June 26, 2020, 13 museums in 7 countries pledged, with Jafa's blessing, to stream the work for free on their respective websites for 48 hours.

Jafa also has worked on a number of music videos and was the director of photography on videos for Solange's "Don't Touch My Hair" and "Cranes in the Sky." He was included in the 2017 ArtReview Power 100 list.

Jafa co-founded TNEG along with Malik Sayeed, a "motion picture studio whose goal is to create a black cinema as culturally, socially, and economically central to the 21st century as was black music to the 20th century". TNEG has produced a number of works such as Dreams Are Colder Than Death and the music video for Jay-Z's song "4:44".

In 2018, Jafa released the approximately forty minute-long video essay entitled The White Album, which uses found video clips from CCTV, cell phones, documentaries, and more to explore whiteness and racism in the United States of America. He was awarded the Golden Lion for best artist at the 2019 Venice Biennale for The White Album.

In 2020, he produced a music video for Kanye West's single "Wash Us in the Blood". He is currently working on a project that is a feature film that focuses on how black music has greatly influenced American culture.

His work is represented by Gavin Brown's Enterprise.

Personal life
While working on a film with Charles Burnett in 1980, Jafa met the director Julie Dash. Dash and Jafa married in 1983 and had a daughter, N'Zinga in 1984. The couple later separated, after collaborating on the film Daughters of the Dust.

Selected filmography 

 Daughters of the Dust
Love is the Message, The Message is Death
The White Album
 Seven Songs for Malcolm X
 The Darker Side of Black
 Crooklyn
 A Litany for Survival: The Life and Work of Audre Lorde
 Rouch in Reverse
 W.E.B. DuBois: A Biography in Four Voices
 Bamako Sigi-Kan
 Conakry Kas
 Shadows of Liberty
 Roomieloverfriends
Don't Touch My Hair
Cranes in the Sky
 Wash Us in the Blood
 The Start Up (2013)
 Dreams Are Colder Than Death
 Florida Water (2014)
 In The Morning
 Killing Me Softly: The Roberta Flack Story

References

External links

1960 births
Living people
American video artists
African-American cinematographers
American cinematographers
Artists from Mississippi
People from Tupelo, Mississippi
20th-century American artists
21st-century American artists
African-American Catholics
Howard University alumni
20th-century African-American artists
21st-century African-American artists